Das Monster aus dem Schrank (English : The Monster from the Closet) is the debut album by German deathcore band We Butter the Bread with Butter. It was released on November 21, 2008 by Redfield Records.

Track listing

Personnel
We Butter the Bread with Butter
Tobias "Tobi" Schultka — vocals, drums, programming
 Marcel "Marci" Neumann — guitars, bass guitar, programming

References

External links
[ Das Monster aus dem Schrank] at Allmusic

2008 debut albums
We Butter the Bread with Butter albums
German-language albums